Pseudluperina is a genus of moths of the family Noctuidae.

Species
 Pseudluperina pozzii (Curò, 1883)

References
Natural History Museum Lepidoptera genus database
Pseudluperina at funet

Xyleninae